The men's 100 kg competition in judo at the 2012 Summer Olympics in London, United Kingdom, took place at ExCeL London between 28 July and 2 August.

The gold and silver medals were determined by a single-elimination tournament, with the winner of the final taking gold and the loser receiving silver. Judo events awarded two bronze medals. Quarterfinal losers competed in a repechage match for the right to face a semifinal loser for a bronze medal (that is, the judokas defeated in quarterfinals A and B competed against each other, with the winner of that match facing the semifinal loser from the other half of the bracket).

Schedule 
All times are British Summer Time (UTC+1)

Results

Finals

Repechages

Pool A

Pool B

Pool C

Pool D

References

Bracket

Men's 100 kg
Judo at the Summer Olympics Men's Half Heavyweight
Men's events at the 2012 Summer Olympics